Meall is a Scottish Gaelic word meaning "hill". It is used in the name of geographical features or locations that are Scottish hills or mountains, including: 

Meall nan Aighean, Scottish mountain in the council area of Perth and Kinross
Meall a' Bhuachaille, mountain in the Cairngorms in Scotland
Meall a' Bhùiridh, mountain on the edge of Rannoch Moor in the Highlands of Scotland
Meall Buidhe, Knoydart, Munro in the Knoydart area
Meall Buidhe, Glen Lyon, Munro on the north side of Glen Lyon
Meall Buidhe (Corbett), Corbett at the head of Glen Lyon
Meall Cheo, 201st–highest peak in Ireland on the Arderin scale
Meall a' Chrasgaidh, Scottish mountain in the Fannich group of mountains, south-southeast of Ullapool
Meall Chuaich, mountain in the Grampian Mountains of Scotland, east of the village of Dalwhinnie
Meall Clachach hill in the Glen Artney Hills range immediately south of the Highland Boundary Fault
Meall Mor (Glen Coe), mountain in the Grampian Mountains of Scotland
Meall nan Con, Scottish mountain in central Sutherland
Meall Corranaich, mountain in the Grampian Mountains of Scotland
 Meall Dearg (Aonach Eagach), Munro forming the western end of the Aonach Eagach
Meall an Dobharchain (The Sow of Atholl) , Scottish hill west-northwest of the town of Blair Atholl in Perth and Kinross
Meall Dubh, mountain in the Northwest Highlands, Scotland
Meall Dearg (Aonach Eagach), large mountain ridge in the Scottish Highlands, marking the northern edge of Glen Coe
Meall nan Eun (Munro), mountain in the Grampian Mountains of Scotland
Meall an Fhudair, mountain in the Grampian Mountains, Scotland
Meall Fuar-mhonaidh, hill on the west side of Loch Ness, in the Highlands of Scotland
Meall Garbh (Càrn Mairg Group), Munro on the north side of Glen Lyon
Meall Garbh (Lawers Group), Munro on the south side of Glen Lyon
Meall Ghaordaidh, mountain in the Southern Highlands of Scotland, north-west of Killin
Meall a' Ghiubhais, mountain in the Northwest Highlands, Scotland
Meall Glas, mountain situated in the southern highlands of Scotland
Meall Greigh, mountain in the southern part of the Scottish Highlands
Meall Garbh (Càrn Mairg Group), mountain on the north side of Glen Lyon in the Scottish Highlands
Meall Garbh (Lawers Group), mountain in the southern part of the Scottish Highlands
Meall Mor (Loch Katrine), mountain in the Grampian Mountains of Scotland
Meall an t-Seallaidh, mountain in the Southern Highlands of Scotland
Meall na h-Eilde, Scottish hill situated in the high ground between the Great Glen and Glen Garry
Meall Mheinnidh, mountain in the Northwest Highlands of Scotland
Meall Odhar, mountain in the Scottish Highlands, to the west of Tyndrum
Meall a' Phubuill, peak in the Northwest Highlands, Scotland, northwest of Fort William in Lochaber
Meall Tàirneachan, mountain in the Grampian Mountains of Scotland, northwest of Aberfeldy in Perthshire
Meall nan Tarmachan, mountain in the Southern Highlands of Scotland near Killin just west of Ben Lawers
Meall na Teanga, Scottish mountain in the Highland council area, north of Spean Bridge

See also
Mountains and hills of Scotland

Geography-related lists
Mountains and hills of Scotland